Liu Yang (born 17 June 1995) is a Chinese professional footballer who currently plays as a left-back or left winger for Chinese Super League club Shandong Taishan.

Club career
In 2010, Liu joined Chinese Super League side Shandong Luneng Taishan's youth academy (now renamed Shandong Taishan}, where he shifted his position from forward to central-back. He was sent to Portugal for further training in 2014. He joined Campeonato de Portugal side Sintrense in the summer of 2014. On 12 October 2014, he made his senior debut in a 2–1 away win against Sacavenense, coming on as a substitute for Romário in the 72nd minute. Liu moved to another Campeonato de Portugal club Cova da Piedade on 1 February 2015. He made his debut for Cova da Piedade on 24 May 2015 in a 3–1 away win over Sacavenense. Liu played six match for the club in the 2015–16 season as Cova da Piedade finish the first place of the league and won promotion to the second tier.

Liu returned to Shandong Luneng and was promoted to the first team squad by manager Felix Magath in July 2016. He played as a left-back under Magath. On 22 October 2016, he made his debut for Shandong in a 4–1 away defeat against Shanghai SIPG, coming on for Song Long in the 70th minute. In the 2018 season, Liu mainly played as a left winger under manager Li Xiaopeng. On 25 September 2018, he scored his first senior goal in a 3–0 home win against Dalian Yifang in the 2018 Chinese FA Cup semi-finals. He scored his first league goal against Changchun Yatai on 2 November 2018, which ensured Shandong's 2–0 victory and sealed a seat for 2019 AFC Champions League. 

In January 2019, Liu extended his contract with the club until the end of the 2023 season. He would repay the club with this contract by establishing himself as a vital member within the team that won the 2020 Chinese FA Cup against Jiangsu Suning F.C. in a 2-0 victory. A consistent versatile regular within the team, he would gain his first league title with the club when he was part of the team that won the 2021 Chinese Super League title. This would be followed up by him winning the 2022 Chinese FA Cup with them the next season.

International career
Liu received his first call up for the China national football team by manager Marcello Lippi for the training camp of 2019 AFC Asian Cup. On 24 December 2018, he made his international senior debut in a 2–1 defeat against Iraq. He was named in the final 23-man squad, and played all five matches for China in the tournament.

Career statistics

Club statistics
Statistics accurate as of match played 31 January 2023.

International statistics

Honours

Club
Cova da Piedade
 Campeonato de Portugal: 2015–16

Shandong Luneng/ Shandong Taishan
Chinese Super League: 2021
Chinese FA Cup: 2020, 2021, 2022.

References

External links
 

1995 births
Living people
Chinese footballers
Footballers from Qingdao
S.U. Sintrense players
C.D. Cova da Piedade players
Shandong Taishan F.C. players
Segunda Divisão players
Chinese Super League players
Association football defenders
Chinese expatriate footballers
Expatriate footballers in Portugal
Chinese expatriate sportspeople in Portugal
China international footballers
Footballers at the 2018 Asian Games
2019 AFC Asian Cup players
Asian Games competitors for China
21st-century Chinese people